9,10-Dibromoanthracene is an organic chemical compound containing anthracene with two bromine atoms substituted on its central ring. It is notable in that it was the first single molecule to have a chemical reaction observed by an atomic force microscope and scanning tunneling microscopy.

Production
Ian M. Heilbron and John S. Heaton were the first to synthesize this in 1923 in England.

Properties
9,10-Dibromoanthracene is electroluminescent, giving off a blue light.

Reactions
The carbon–bromine bonds can be fragmented in two successive steps by voltage pulses from tip of a scanning tunneling microscope. The resulting carbon radicals are stabilized by the sodium chloride substrate on which the 9,10-dibromoanthracene reactant was placed. Further voltage pulses cause the diradical to convert to a diyne (or back again) via a Bergman cyclization reaction.

References

Bromoarenes
Anthracenes